4VL  is a radio station in Charleville, Queensland, Australia. It is owned by Resonate Radio along with other sister stations around Queensland. This company is owned by Rex Morris, Guy Dobson, Sally Dobson

The 4VL building located on Wills Street, Charleville also houses West FM, servicing the Great South West and Warrego Districts.

Weekday Program Guide

References

External links
 4VL website

Radio stations in Queensland
Radio stations established in 1936
Classic hits radio stations in Australia
Resonate Broadcasting